Behice Arzu Ceylan is a female, Turkish, former European champion Taekwondo practitioner.

Achievements
  1990 European Championships - Aarhus, Denmark -43 kg

Honors
 Milliyet Sports Awards 1990 Turkish Athlete of The Year

References

Sportspeople from Sydney
Living people
Turkish female taekwondo practitioners
Turkish female martial artists
Year of birth missing (living people)
European Taekwondo Championships medalists
20th-century Turkish sportswomen